Mehmet Özhaseki, (born 25 May 1957, Kayseri, Turkey) is a Turkish politician of the Justice and Development Party (AK Party) and former Minister of Environment and Urban Planning. He is a former Mayor of Kayseri.

Early life and education 
Mehmet Özhaseki was born in Kayseri, turkey on 25 May 1957. Özhaseki began his education in Kayseri and went on to study electronic engineering at Hacettepe University. He completed his education at the Istanbul University Faculty of Law.

Political career

Mayor of Kayseri 
He was elected to the Melikgazi Municipality in the March 1994 elections. In the 2004 elections he was elected Mayor of Kayseri with 72% of the vote. According to Christopher Caldwell, he attributes his success to "good government".

He stood again in the March 2009 election and was re-elected as Mayor of Kayseri.

Minister of Environment and Urban Planning 
Özhaseki was elected as a Justice and Development Party (AKP) Member of Parliament for Ankara's Kayseri in the June 2015 general election. He was re-elected in November 2015. He was appointed as the Minister of Environment and Urban Planning in the 65th government of Turkey by Prime Minister Binali Yıldırım on 24 November 2015.

References

External links

1957 births
Living people
Mayors of places in Turkey
Justice and Development Party (Turkey) politicians
Turkish football chairmen and investors
Members of the 25th Parliament of Turkey
Members of the 26th Parliament of Turkey
Members of the 65th government of Turkey
Istanbul University Faculty of Law alumni